Pteridrys is a genus of ferns in the family Tectariaceae, according to the Pteridophyte Phylogeny Group classification of 2016 (PPG I).

Taxonomy
The genus Pteridrys was erected by Carl Christensen and Ren-Chang Ching in 1934. The type species is Pteridrys syrmatica, transferred from Aspidium syrmaticum.

A 2016 molecular phylogenetic showed Pteridrys to be related to two new genera, Draconopteris and Malaifilix, separate from the clade containing Tectaria.

Species
, the Checklist of Ferns and Lycophytes of the World recognized the following species:
Pteridrys acutissima Ching ex C.Chr. & Ching
Pteridrys australis Ching ex C.Chr. & Ching
Pteridrys cnemidaria (Christ) C.Chr. et. Ching
Pteridrys confertiloba Holttum
Pteridrys costularis Li Bing Zhang, Liang Zhang, N.T.Lu & X.M.Zhou
Pteridrys dongshiyongii Li Bing Zhang & X.M.Zhou
Pteridrys dorsifixa Li Bing Zhang & X.M.Zhou
Pteridrys hanoiensis Li Bing Zhang, Liang Zhang, N.T.Lu & X.M.Zhou
Pteridrys lofouensis (Christ) C.Chr. & Ching
Pteridrys microthecia (Fée) C.Chr. & Ching
Pteridrys olivacea (Rosenst.) Copel.
Pteridrys syrmatica (Willd.) C.Chr. & Ching
Pteridrys vietnamensis Li Bing Zhang, Liang Zhang, N.T.Lu & X.M.Zhou

References

Tectariaceae
Fern genera
Taxa named by Ren-Chang Ching